Brooks County High School is a high school serving Quitman, Georgia, United States. It has won several Georgia Interscholastic Association state football championships.

The school offers community service clubs, technology and career clubs, and honors and special interest clubs. Sports include football, basketball, volleyball, softball, cheerleading, tennis, baseball, golf, wrestling, soccer, and track.

The school is located at 1801 Moultrie Highway.

Notable alumni
 Kendra Norman-Bellamy, Christian author
 Marcus Stroud, football player
 Lawrence Virgil,  football player

References

External links
 

Public high schools in Georgia (U.S. state)